OKf100 – was the designation used for a single Czechoslovakian-built passenger steam locomotive (with a  Lithuanian TK series tender) on the Polish State Railways. After 1945, one steam locomotive of this series was used in Poland, classified as the only example in the OKf100 series.

The locomotive belonged to the Lithuanian TK series of passenger tenders, consisting of four units, manufactured in 1932 by the Czechoslovakian Škoda plants and bearing numbers from 11 to 14. These locomotives originally ran on standard gauge tracks, then after Lithuania joined the USSR, they were converted into broad-gauge units. During World War II, they found themselves in Austria, again converted into standard gauge.

Unit 14 (factory number 754) was delivered to Poland, marked in the meantime as PK 14 for unknown reasons. During World War Two, the locomotive served in the Škirotava engine house in Latvia, and then in Vienna-Hütteldorf in Austria. The unit arrived in Poland on November 15, 1948, mistakenly listed as using the Polish designation TKp14. It entered the PKP inventory under the designation OKf100-1 and was sent for repair at the Wrocław-Nadodrze workshops, but repairs were not started and was deleted from the roster in 1950. The boiler was used for heating purposes in Wrocław until 1975. 

The steam locomotive had a twin-cylinder engine, with a front axle on a Bissel semi-truck. The locomotive is equipped with a Knorr system brake. The linked axles and the  Krauss-Helmholtz two-axle rear bogie are equipped with brakes. Above the boiler is a steam dome, a sandbox and a third hood to purify the feed water.

References

Bibliography 

 Herman Gijsbert Hesselink, Norbert Tempel: Eisenbahnen im Baltikum, Münster, 1996, .
 Tomasz Roszak: Parowozy Litwy i Łotwy w służbie PKP, „Świat Kolei” nr 3/2002(080), s. 11–12
Polish State Railways steam locomotives